Tricolia gabiniana is a species of small sea snail with calcareous opercula, a marine gastropod mollusk in the family Phasianellidae, the pheasant snails.

Description
The height of the shell reaches 7 mm.

Distribution
This marine species occurs in the intertidal zone off Western Australia.

References

 Wilson, B. (1993). Australian Marine Shells. Prosobranch Gastropods. Kallaroo, WA : Odyssey Publishing. Vol.1 1st Edn

External links
 To World Register of Marine Species

Phasianellidae
Gastropods described in 1938